Melhus Energi is a defunct power company that operated hydro electric power plants and the power grid in Melhus, Norway. Until it merged with TrønderEnergi in 2001 it was owned entirely by the municipality of Melhus.

References

Energy companies disestablished in 2001
Defunct electric power companies of Norway
Companies based in Trøndelag